
This is a list of aircraft in numerical order of manufacturer followed by alphabetical order beginning with 'M'.

Mp

MP
(Moto-Plane Aviation Inc.)
 MP Moto-Plane

MPC Aircraft 
(c/o Airbus, Kreetslag 10, 21129 Hamburg, Germany)
 MPC 75 (DAA92/122, Regioliner R92/122, FASA)

References

Further reading

External links 

 List Of Aircraft (M)

fr:Liste des aéronefs (I-M)